"I Just Want to Make Love to You" is a blues song written by Willie Dixon. In 1954, it was recorded by Muddy Waters, and released as a single with the title "Just Make Love to Me". The song reached number four on Billboard magazine's R&B Best Sellers chart.

Backing Waters on vocals are Little Walter on harmonica, Jimmy Rogers on guitar, Otis Spann on piano, Willie Dixon on bass, and Fred Below on drums.  Waters recorded the song again for the album Electric Mud (1968).

Versions by other artists
In 1960, Etta James recorded the song for her debut album At Last! Her rendition also served as the B-side to her hit of that name. In 1996, it was released as a single in the UK and other European markets after being featured in a Diet Coke advertising campaign. The single reached No. 7 in Ireland, No. 27 in the Netherlands, and, in Belgium, Nos. 31 (Flanders) and 15 (Wallonia).

In 1972, British blues rock group Foghat recorded a studio version for their self-titled debut album in 1972.  The song was also released as a single and it became their first single to reach the charts, appearing at No. 83 on the Billboard Hot 100 and No. 31 in Australia. An eight-minute version from a 1977 concert performance is included on Foghat Live.  It was edited down to 3:56 release as a single, which reached number 33 on the Billboard Hot 100 and No. 28 on the RPM Top Singles chart in Canada.

References

1954 songs
Songs written by Willie Dixon
Blues songs
Muddy Waters songs
Willie Dixon songs
1954 singles
1964 singles
1972 debut singles
Foghat songs
Chess Records singles
Etta James songs
The Rolling Stones songs
London Records singles
Bearsville Records singles
Argo Records singles